Hey! Luciani: The Life and Codex of John Paul I is a play written by Mark E. Smith, the lead singer of the band the Fall. Described by its author as "a cross between Shakespeare and The Prisoner", the play centres on the mysterious death of Pope John Paul I – born Albino Luciani – in 1978.

The script for the play was supposedly written by Smith on beer mats and delivered to the play's director in a shoe box. Starring Smith and the performance artist Leigh Bowery, Hey! Luciani: The Life and Codex of John Paul I ran for two weeks in December 1986 at Riverside Studios, Hammersmith, west London. In the same month, The Fall released one of the songs from the play, "Hey! Luciani," as a single.

Versions of other songs from the play have also been released as tracks on Fall albums:

 "Dktr. Faustus" (on Bend Sinister, 1986)
 "Living Too Late" (single, featured on some formats of Bend Sinister, 1986)
 "Mark'll Sink Us", "Haf Found Bormann", "Sleep Debt Snatches" (B-sides to "There's a Ghost in My House", 1987, collected on 458489 B-Sides, 1990)

References

1986 plays
Plays set in Italy
Plays set in the 1970s
Plays based on real people
Biographical plays about religious leaders
Popes in art
Cultural depictions of Pope John Paul I
The Fall (band)